Boubacar Traoré (born 1942 in Kayes, Mali) is a Malian singer, songwriter, and guitarist.

Early fame
Traoré first came to prominence in the early 1960s. He had taught himself to play guitar and developed a unique style that blended American blues music, Arab music, and pentatonic structures found in West Africa's Mande cultural region. He was a superstar in Mali and a symbol of the newly independent country (see History of Mali). His songs were immensely popular and he enjoyed regular radio play. However, he made no recordings, and since there were no royalties paid to musicians, he was very poor.

Decline and revival

In 1968, when Moussa Traoré overthrew Malian president Modibo Keïta, Boubacar Traoré, widely seen as an artist associated with the previous regime, disappeared from the airwaves. During the 1970s Traoré's popularity faded, until a surprise television appearance in 1987. Soon after this "rediscovery," Boubacar's wife died during childbirth. Grief-stricken, he moved to France and did construction work to support his six children. While there, a British record producer discovered a tape of one of Traoré's radio performances, and he was finally signed to a record deal. His first album, Mariama, was released in 1990. Since then, Traoré has enjoyed international popularity, touring Europe, Africa, and North America.

Boubacar figures in the book Mali Blues (Lonely Planet, Australia), by Belgian writer Lieve Joris. The book inspired Swiss film director Jacques Sarasin for the 2001 film Je chanterai pour toi ("I'll Sing For You") about Boubacar, released on DVD in 2005.
Along with several blues artists, he appeared in the film Blues Road Movie (Au Coeur du Blues) by Louis Mouchet (2001).

Boubacar then released Kongo Magni (Marabi, 2005), produced by Christian Mousset, director of the Festival Musiques Métisses d'Angoulême (Angoulême Cross-Cultural Music Festival), who would also produce his Mali Denhou (Lusafrica, 2010). Kar Kar made up for lost time with acclaimed live performances around Europe and then the United States and Canada. Mbalimaou (My Brothers) was released in February 2015, followed by Dounia Tabalo in November 2017.

Discography
 Mariama (1990)
 Kar Kar (1992)
 Les Enfants de Pierrette (1995)
 Sa Golo (1996)
 Maciré (2000)
 Je chanterai pour toi (2003)
 The Best of Boubacar Traoré: The Bluesman from Mali (2003)
 Kongo Magni (2005)
 Mali Denhou (2011)
 Mbalimaou (2014)
 Dounia Tabalo (2017)

References

External links
 Biography from World Music Central
 Biography from Concerted Efforts
 Article from Sonicnet (republished on Global Village Idiot)
 

1942 births
Living people
Traoré clan members
Wrasse Records artists
People from Kayes
Malian blues guitarists
20th-century Malian male singers
21st-century Malian male singers
Label Bleu artists